VXA is a tape backup format originally created by Ecrix and now owned by Tandberg Data.  After the merger between Ecrix and Exabyte on 17 November 2001, VXA was produced by Exabyte Corporation. On November 20, 2006, Exabyte was purchased by Tandberg Data that has since stopped further development of the format.

How it works 
Exabyte and Ecrix describe the data format as "packet technology."  Since VXA is based on helical scan technology, data is written across the tape from side to side in helical strips.

The novel part of VXA packet technology is that each stripe starts with a unique packet ID and ends with an ECC packet checksum. As each stripe is written to tape, it is immediately read back to verify that the write was successful.

If the write was not 100% successful the packet can be rewritten at another point on the tape without stopping. When the data is read back, the packets are reassembled into a "buffer" by their packet ID.  The buffer has 3 additional ECCs to ensure data integrity.

Another aspect of VXA is that there are 2 read heads for each stripe, slightly offset in relation to each other to allow for more flexibility in reading tapes written by other drives.

Due to the relatively slow tape speed inherent to helical scan technology, the drive is able to stop and start the tape much more quickly to avoid the need to backhitch.

Market context 
The VXA format competes mainly against the DDS, and DLT-IV formats.

Overview

VXA-3 
Exabyte released two different product lines based on VXA-3 technology, VXA-320 in 2005 and VXA-172 in 2006.  VXA-172 drives are limited to 86 GB per tape cartridge, but can be unlocked (for a fee) to remove the limit.  They are otherwise the same. VXA-3 was the first helical scan system in production to feature thin film MR heads.

Notes 
 Data Capacity figures above are for uncompressed data. Exabyte assumes a 2x compression factor in their marketing material.

Media 
Media was released on two families (V and X), with different capacities based on the length of the tape, and the drive it is being used in.

Gallery

Cartridge / tape

Mechanism / drive

Tape and drive together

References

External links 

 ECMA 316 Specification of VXA-1.
 ECMA 222 Specification of ALDC, the data compression standard for VXA-1.
 VXA Alliance

Computer storage tape media
Ecma standards